Argophyllum curtum is a plant in the Argophyllaceae family endemic to a small part of north eastern Queensland. It was described and named in 2018.

Taxonomy
This species was first described, along with a number of other new species in this genus, in 2018 by the Australian botanists Anthony Bean and Paul Forster who published it in the Journal Austrobaileya. The type specimen was collected in 2005 near Cairns by Forster.

Etymology
The genus name Argophyllum is derived from Ancient Greek Árgos meaning white or shining, and phúllon meaning leaf. It refers to the white colouration of the underside of the leaves. The species epithet curtum is from the Latin curtus, meaning short, and refers to the shallow teeth on the edges of the leaves.

Distribution and habitat
A. curtum is restricted to a small area of the Wet Tropics of Queensland between Kuranda and Edmonton near Cairns. It is usually found on the margins of rainforest and streams as well as open forest. It grows on soils derived from basalt.

Conservation
This species is listed by the Queensland Department of Environment and Science as least concern. , it has not been assessed by the IUCN.

References

External links
 
 
 View a map of historical sightings of this species at the Australasian Virtual Herbarium
 View observations of this species on iNaturalist
 View images of this species on Flickriver

Taxa named by Paul Irwin Forster
Taxa named by Anthony Bean
Argophyllaceae
Endemic flora of Queensland
Taxa described in 2018